Morais or Moraes (the latter is an archaic spelling in Portugal, but contemporary in Brazil and India —  or  for both variants) is a Portuguese surname.

The link between Morais/Moraes and the Spanish surname Morales is controversial.

Notable people with the name include:

Moraes 

Abrahão de Moraes (1916–1970), Brazilian astronomer and mathematician
Adriano Moraes (bull rider) (born 1970), Brazilian rodeo performer
Alexandre de Moraes (born 1968), Brazilian jurist
Alinne Moraes (born 1982), Brazilian actress
Antônio Ermírio de Moraes (1928–2014), Brazilian businessman and billionaire
Carolina Moraes (born 1980), Brazilian synchronized swimmer
Cícero Moraes (born 1982), Brazilian 3D designer
Claude Moraes (born 1965), British politician
Dom Moraes (1938–2004), Indian writer and poet
Drica Moraes (born 1969), Brazilian actress
Ederson Moraes (born 1993), Brazilian footballer
Francisco de Moraes (c. 1500 – 1572), Portuguese writer
Frank Moraes (1907–1974), Indian newspaper editor
Henrietta Moraes (1931–1999), British model and memoirist
Isabela Moraes (born 1980), Brazilian synchronized swimmer
Mestre Moraes (born 1950), Brazilian capoeira master
Premnath Moraes (1923-1998), Sri Lankan Tamil actor, director, and screenwriter
Vinicius de Moraes (1913–1980), Brazilian writer, composer, and diplomat
Walter Moraes (1934–1997), Brazilian jurist

Morais 

Bráulio Morais (born 1990), Angolan basketball player
Carlos Morais (basketball) (born 1985), Angolan basketball player
Carlos Pedro Silva Morais (born 1976), Cape Verdean footballer known as "Caló"
Clodomir Santos de Morais (1928–2016), Brazilian sociologist
Cristiane de Morais Smith Lehner, Brazilian theoretical physicist
Daniel Morais Reis (born 1986), Brazilian footballer 
Danny Morais (born 1985), Brazilian footballer
Davidson Morais (born 1981), Brazilian footballer
Diego Morais Pacheco (born 1983), Brazilian footballer
Edgar Morais (born 1989), Portuguese actor, writer and director
Ellinton Antonio Costa Morais (born 1990), Brazilian footballer
Fernando Morais (born 1946), Brazilian writer and politician
Filipe Morais (born 1985), Portuguese footballer
Frederico Morais (born 1992), Portuguese surfer
Hugo Morais (born 1978), Portuguese footballer
Jean-Claude Bastos de Morais (born 1967), Swiss-Angolan entrepreneur
João Baptista Mascarenhas de Morais (1883–1968), Brazilian Army officer
João Morais (1935–2010), Portuguese footballer
John Victor Morais (1910–1991), Malaysian writer and journalist
José Morais (born 1965), Portuguese football coach
Júnior Morais (born 1986), Brazilian-Romanian footballer
Kevin Anthony Morais (1960–2015), Malaysian Deputy Public Prosecutor
Lui Morais (born 1961), Brazilian writer
Manoel Morais Amorim (born 1984), Brazilian footballer
Marcos Evangelista de Morais (born 1970), Brazilian footballer known as "Cafu"
Nélson Morais (born 1974), Portuguese footballer
Nuno Morais (born 1984), Portuguese footballer
Nuno Morais (athlete) (1923–1986), Portuguese sprinter
Olinda Morais (born 1951), East Timorese politician
Patrícia Morais (born 1992), Portuguese footballer
Paulo de Morais (born 1963), Portuguese professor and politician
Prudente de Morais (1841–1902), Brazilian president
Ricardo Morais (born 1967), Brazilian mixed martial artist
Richard C. Morais (born 1960), Canadian-American writer
Sabato Morais (1823–1897), Italian-American rabbi
Stephan Morais (born 1973), English and Portuguese businessman
Ulisses Morais (born 1959), Portuguese footballer
Umeshka Morais (born 1995), Sri Lankan cricketer
Valdiram Caetano de Morais (1982–2019), Brazilian footballer
Wilder Morais (born 1968), Brazilian politician
William Morais (1991–2011), Brazilian footballer

Given name 

Morais Abreu (born 1968), Angolan beach volleyball player
Morais Guy, Jamaican politician

References

See also 

Morais (Macedo de Cavaleiros), a Portuguese parish in the municipality of Macedo de Cavaleiros (Bragança District)
Morais ophiolite complex, a geologic formation in Portugal
De Moraes (crater), a lunar impact crater
Morales, a Spanish surname

Portuguese-language surnames